Brazos Island, also known as Brazos Santiago Island, is a barrier island on the Gulf Coast of Texas in the United States, south of the town of South Padre Island. The island is located in Cameron County.

Brazos Santiago Pass partitions the barrier islands of Brazos Island and Padre Island in the Lower Rio Grande Valley.

References
 
 
 "A Decade of Beneficial Use, Brazos Island Harbor, Dredging" by T. Neil McLellan, P.E., Herbie Maurer, P.E., Bob Fudge, P.E., and Dan J. Heilman, P.E.
 A description of the Expedition from Brazos Santiago

External links
 

Barrier islands of Texas
Landforms of Cameron County, Texas
State parks of Texas
Uninhabited islands of the United States